Ponir is a village in the municipality of Banja Luka, Republika Srpska, Bosnia and Herzegovina. It is located on the mountain Ponir, near the city of Banja Luka. 

Until 1969 and the subsequent earthquake in Banja Luka, a four-year school operated in the village.

Demography 
According to the first population censuses, about 400 people lived in the village.

See also
Banja Luka

References

Villages in Republika Srpska
Populated places in Banja Luka